Fabrizio Grillo (born 2 February 1987) is an Italian footballer who currently plays for ASD Atletico Lariano 1963. He is a left back but can also play as a left winger. He is a former Italy U-17 international.

Club career
Grillo began playing football at joined Lazio academy, he left them in 2001 to join rivals Roma, becoming a member of the first team squad at age 16.

Before a loan spell at Sambenedettese he left Roma to join Arezzo in 2007, where he played 39 games. He joined Crotone on loan during the 2009–10 season, playing 18 times. In 2010, he moved to Bulgarian side CSKA Sofia , where he plays in the UEFA Europa League, debuting September 30, 2010 in the home game against FC Porto, the game finished 0–1. Grillo was part of the squad which won the Bulgarian Cup under manager Milen Radukanov.

In summer 2011 signed a three-year deal with Serie B side Varese.

Siena
After impressing at Varese, In January 2013, Grillo joined Serie A side Siena on a co-ownership deal. He made his debut against Juventus in Serie A. On May 12, 2013 in the 2–1 loss against S.S.C. Napoli, Grillo scored his first goal in the top flight with a left footed strike. However, Siena were relegated to Serie B at the end of the 2012/13 season.

In January 2014, Grillo rejoined Varese on loan until the end of the season, helping Varese stay in the division after beating Novara in the relegation playoffs. After returning from loan, Grillo was released by Siena with Siena later announcing they were bankrupt. Siena also received the remaining 50% registration rights of Grillo from Varese.

Pescara
In August 2014, Grillo revealed after interest from Leeds United F.C. and Wolverhampton Wanderers F.C. that he had joined Pescara. He was assigned number 33 shirt.

Pavia
Grillo failed to play any game in 2015–16 Serie B. On 7 January 2016 Grillo was signed by Pavia in a definitive deal.

Livorno and Sambenedettese
After the bankruptcy of Pavia, Grillo joined Livorno as a free agent. In January 2017 he was transferred to Sambenedettese on a temporary deal.

Triestina 
On 24 August 2017 he was signed by Triestina.

Later career
On 12 July 2019, Grillo joined Atletico Lariano.

International career
Grillo was capped by Italy, from  Italy U-15 to Italy U-17 level.

Honours
Bulgarian Cup 2010/11 with CSKA Sofia

References

External links
 FIGC 
 

1987 births
Living people
Italian footballers
Italian expatriate footballers
A.S. Sambenedettese players
S.S. Arezzo players
F.C. Crotone players
PFC CSKA Sofia players
S.S.D. Varese Calcio players
A.C.N. Siena 1904 players
Delfino Pescara 1936 players
F.C. Pavia players
U.S. Livorno 1915 players
U.S. Triestina Calcio 1918 players
Serie A players
Serie B players
Serie C players
First Professional Football League (Bulgaria) players
Expatriate footballers in Bulgaria
Association football defenders